Sigel is an unincorporated community in Jefferson County, Pennsylvania, United States. Sigel has a post office with ZIP code 15860, which opened on May 26, 1862.

History
Sigel was originally called Haggerty, and under the latter name was laid out in 1850 by Judah P. Haggerty.  In 1865, it was renamed after German-American Civil War major general Franz Sigel.

Notable person
 Bob Shawkey, former baseball player and member of the New York Yankees' first World Series championship team in 1923

References

Unincorporated communities in Jefferson County, Pennsylvania
Unincorporated communities in Pennsylvania
1850 establishments in Pennsylvania